Mitella breweri is a species of flowering plant in the saxifrage family known by the common names Brewer's mitrewort and Brewer's bishop's cap. It is native to western North America from British Columbia to central California (Sierra Nevada range) and Nevada, where it grows in moist meadows, woods, and mountain forests. It is a rhizomatous perennial herb growing up to about 30 or 40 centimeters tall. Most of the leaves occur around the base of the stem. They have rounded blades several centimeters wide and edges divided into dull toothed lobes. The erect inflorescence bears several flowers, sometimes over 50, usually along one side of the stem. The distinctive flower is saucer-shaped with five greenish petals which are divided into narrow, whiskerlike lobes.

This plant is listed as Pectiantia breweri by Calflora.

External links

CalFlora.org
Jepson Manual Treatment
Photo gallery

breweri
Flora of Western Canada
Flora of the Western United States
Flora without expected TNC conservation status